The Varisci (German: Varisker) were a Germanic tribe, the presumed prior inhabitants of a medieval district, Provincia Variscorum, the same (in presumption) as the Vogtland district of Saxony in Germany. They do not appear under that name exactly in ancient history, however, but rather come on stage boldly and abruptly in the Germania (Chapter 42) of Tacitus as the Naristi, with manuscript variants of Narisci and Varisti. Perhaps the historical name of the mediaeval province is to be regarded as the final authority, but there are other possibilities:

The sources only state Latinized names of native originals that could be spelled in various ways in Latin.
 The people were in the process of changing their name.

Tacitus describes the location of the Varisci as being along the line of the Danube between the Hermunduri at its source and the Marcomanni and Quadi in Bohemia. Ptolemy (Book 2, Chapter 10) adds that the Ouaristoi were south of the Sudeten Mountains and west of Gabreta Forest. The sources thus agree on their location.

Tacitus says that they were allies of the Marcomanni and Quadi in their bold expulsion of the Celtic Boii from their ancient home. Very likely, then, all three allies were not from that region, but moved into it in the time of Julius Caesar (in the 1st century BC). We do not know where they had been or what they had been called. One presumes that the Marcomanni ("border men") took their name from being on the Danubian frontier. The Narisci are stated to be of the Suebi. That is all history tells us.

Ptolemy states the names of some towns in the district, but what language they are or whether they were taken over or founded anew he does not say. The towns that might reasonably be interpreted as in the Variscan domain are Bicurgium, Menosgada, Marobudum, Setuacotum, Brodentia, Abilunum and Usbium on the Danube.

History records the probable end of the Varisci without giving us anything in between. It was equally bold and sudden as the beginning. On or about the year 167, all the peoples along the Danube, Germanic and other, suddenly attacked the Roman frontier in the reign of Marcus Aurelius. Perhaps they   mistook goodness for weakness. He rushed to the defense of the realm and after a long series of episodes, called by us the Marcomannic Wars, because the Marcomanni had instigated and coordinated the attack, forced the enemy to terms.
During the fight, the chief of the Naristi ...Valao was killed by the Roman General Marcus Valerius Maximianus.

The Marcomannic Wars are chronicled and explained in Marcellinus Ammianus, although the Varisci are not mentioned there. They do find brief mention as the Varistae of the Vita Marci Antonini Philosophi (Chapter 22) of Julius Capitolinus. They were among the tribes who crossed the Danube, but are not mentioned after that, nor do they continue in their province, as the Armalausi inhabit it in the Peutinger Tables.

The best guess as to their eventual fate is that they were transplanted to Italy, along with many other Danube-dwelling warrior peoples, by Marcus Aurelius, where he could watch over them. This kind of solution is familiar to us in modern times. Subsequent Germanic attacks overwhelmed and overran the empire. The Varisci probably lost their identity after the fall of the Roman Empire.

See also
List of ancient Germanic peoples
Noricum

References

Early Germanic peoples